The WWE Divas Championship was a women's professional wrestling world championship in WWE. The championship was created by WWE in 2008, and was introduced as part of the WWE brand extension via a storyline by then SmackDown General Manager Vickie Guerrero as an alternative to Raw's WWE Women's Championship.

Michelle McCool became the inaugural champion on July 20, 2008, when she defeated Natalya at The Great American Bash. After then-WWE Divas Champion Maryse was drafted to Raw as part of the 2009 WWE draft, she took the title with her. McCool won a match against Melina to unify the WWE Divas and Women's titles at the Night of Champions pay-per-view on September 19, 2010, creating the Unified WWE Divas Championship;  it eventually dropped the "Unified" moniker. The youngest woman to win the Divas Championship is Paige, at age 21.

The title was retired in 2016 at WrestleMania 32, after WWE Hall of Famer Lita revealed a brand-new Women's Championship, which would later be called the Raw Women's Championship, to replace the Divas Championship. The match for the new title took place at the event between the reigning Divas Champion Charlotte Flair and her opponents Becky Lynch and Sasha Banks in a triple threat match. Therefore, Charlotte Flair was the last Divas champion.

History 

With the first WWE brand extension in 2002, a storyline division in which WWE assigned its employees to different television programs and touring companies, the WWE Women's Championship was originally to be defended on both brands. At some point that year, however, it became exclusive to the Raw brand. Thereafter, only Divas on the Raw brand were able to compete for the title, while the Divas on the SmackDown brand were unable to compete for a women's-exclusive championship. However, on a few occasions, the regulation was bypassed with Melina, Ashley Massaro, Torrie Wilson, and Nidia challenging for the title while on the SmackDown brand, but none were successful.

As a result, WWE created the WWE Divas Championship and introduced it on the June 6, 2008 episode of SmackDown when then SmackDown General Manager Vickie Guerrero announced the creation of the title. On the June 6 and July 4, editions of SmackDown, Natalya and Michelle McCool won their respective Golden Dreams match (also involving Maryse, Victoria, Kelly Kelly, Cherry, and Layla) to qualify for the Divas Championship match. At The Great American Bash, McCool defeated Natalya to become the inaugural champion. When Maryse won the title from McCool in December 2008, she dislocated her kneecap at a live event later that month. Similar to how Trish Stratus kept the Women's Championship when she was sidelined with a herniated disc in 2005, Maryse was able to keep the Divas title upon her return in late January 2009. As part of the 2009 WWE draft, then Divas Champion Maryse was one of the people drafted to the Raw brand, in the process making the championship exclusive to Raw.

On January 4, 2010, WWE vacated the title after the current Divas Champion Melina sustained a torn anterior cruciate ligament. A tournament was started two weeks later on Raw, where former Divas Champion Maryse qualified over Brie Bella, Alicia Fox qualified over Kelly Kelly, Eve Torres qualified over Katie Lea Burchill, and Gail Kim qualified over former Divas Champion Jillian Hall. In the semifinals, Maryse defeated Eve Torres, and Gail Kim defeated Alicia Fox. On February 22 episode of Raw, Maryse defeated Gail Kim to win the vacant championship, making her the first person to hold the title on more than one occasion. It was announced on the August 30 episode of Raw that the Divas Championship would be unified with the Women's Championship at a match at Night of Champions. With that, the title (known briefly as the WWE Unified Divas Championship) became accessible to both WWE brands and the champion could appear on both shows, a situation made permanent by the ending of the brand extension in 2011. In August 2014, the Divas Championship belt, along with all other pre-existing championship belts in WWE at the time, received a minor update, replacing the long-standing scratch logo with WWE's new logo originally used for the WWE Network.

On April 6, 2014, AJ Lee became the first and only woman to defend the Divas Championship at WrestleMania for WrestleMania XXX.

On the WrestleMania 32 pre-show, former WWE Diva and Hall of Famer Lita announced that the scheduled triple threat match for the Divas Championship between Charlotte, Becky Lynch, and Sasha Banks was instead going to be for the new WWE Women's Championship (does not share the same lineage as the original WWE Women's Championship). It was also announced that the Divas Championship would be retired, and all female performers would become WWE Superstars in the process, coincidentally retiring the term "Diva".

WWE Divas Championship Tournament (2010) 
On January 4, 2010, WWE vacated the title after then Divas Champion Melina sustained a torn anterior cruciate ligament. A tournament was started two weeks later on Raw. On February 22 episode of Raw, Maryse defeated Gail Kim to win the vacant championship, making her the first person to hold the title on more than one occasion.

 The tournament final was originally scheduled at Elimination Chamber, but when official consultant to the SmackDown General Manager Vickie Guerrero interrupted, she announced that she was changing the match to an interbrand Divas tag team match, with Maryse and Gail Kim facing LayCool (Michelle McCool and Layla) from SmackDown. The final was held the following night on Raw.

Brand designation history 
The following is a list of dates indicating the transitions of the Divas Championship between the Raw and SmackDown brands.

Reigns 

There were 26 total reigns and 1 vacancy. The inaugural champion was Michelle McCool, who defeated Natalya to win the title at The Great American Bash on July 20, 2008.

Eve Torres and AJ Lee hold the record for most reigns as Divas Champion with three each. AJ Lee holds the record for most combined days as champion with 406 days, while Nikki Bella holds the record for longest individual reign at 301 days. Jillian Hall has the shortest reign at five minutes. Layla is the oldest Divas Champion, having won at the age of 34, while Paige is the youngest Divas Champion in history at 21 years of age, and is also the only woman to win the title in her debut.

The final champion was Charlotte, who was in her first and only reign. She defeated Nikki Bella on September 20, 2015, at Night of Champions in Houston, Texas to win the title. Charlotte was originally scheduled to defend the title at WrestleMania 32 against Sasha Banks and Becky Lynch, but during the event it was announced that the scheduled triple threat match would instead be for the new WWE Women's Championship (now Raw Women's Championship), with the Divas Championship subsequently being retired. Charlotte won the match and the Women's Championship; this ended her reign as Divas Champion and began a new reign as Women's Champion.

References

External links 
 Official WWE Divas Championship history
 

WWE Diva
WWE women's championships